The Oscar N. Harris Student Union is a  student union that is located on the campus of Campbell University, which is located in Buies Creek, NC, near Lillington, the county seat of Harnett County, NC. The building houses a single-screen movie theater, a workout room, a bookstore, and several restaurants, a snack bar (known as Oasis) and a deli. The student union is named after the mayor of Dunn, North Carolina, Oscar N. Harris.

History 
The development of the Student Union was proposed by Jerry M. Wallace, the fourth president of Campbell University, in 2014. After J. Bradley Creed became president, he started to develop a plan for a new student union, opening sometime around Fall 2019. The placement of the building was overlapped with two dorms that were later demolished in 2018 when Campbell moved the dorm to the newly-opened Luby Wood Hall.

Construction 
After the demolition of the two student dorms, construction began on April 25, 2018, with the ground breaking of the new student union. On the same day, the new McLeod Admissions and Financial Aid Center opened to the public.

Commemoration 

The official name of the student union was given to Oscar N. Harris, the mayor of Dunn, North Carolina, on January 29, 2020.

References

Buildings and structures in Harnett County, North Carolina
Campbell University
University and college buildings completed in 2020